Indigofera sokotrana is a species of plant in the family Fabaceae. It is found only in Yemen. Its natural habitat is subtropical or tropical dry forests.

References

sokotrana
Endemic flora of Socotra
Vulnerable flora of Africa
Vulnerable flora of Asia
Taxonomy articles created by Polbot